Athol Williams (born 20 June 1970) is a South African poet, social philosopher and public intellectual based at Oxford University.

Life 
Williams was born in Lansdowne, Cape Town, South Africa, and grew up in Mitchells Plain, the coloured township established under apartheid. Before becoming a professional writer and social philosopher, he worked in business for fifteen years, mainly as a strategy advisor.

It was at the University of the Witwatersrand, in 1991, that he published his first poem, "New South Africa", in the student publication Wits Student. The poem captured the newfound optimism associated with the release from prison of Nelson Mandela and other anti-apartheid leaders in 1990.

He is the co-founder of Read to Rise, an NGO that promotes youth literacy by making appropriate books available to children in poor communities and founder of the Institute of Social and Corporate Ethics (ISCE). He serves on the board of New Contrast Literary Magazine, a South African literary journal, and is the founder of the Cape Flats Book Festival.

Anti-corruption 
Williams is acknowledged for his anti-corruption and ethical business stance. In October 2019, Williams blew the whistle on Bain & Company stating that they had withheld relevant information from the Nugent Commission investigating irregularities at South African Revenue Service. In December 2019, several media outlets reported that Bain had attempted to buy Williams's silence. The Nugent Commission found that Bain did not make full disclosure. Bain have denied these allegations.

In March 2021, Williams testified for two days before the State Capture Commission presenting evidence relating to Bain's alliance with Jacob Zuma and Tom Moyane in alleged state capture in South Africa. The Commission's final report concluded that Bain's behaviour was 'unlawful' and praised Williams for rejecting hush money and acknowledged his contribution, stating 'it particularly wishes to express its appreciation to Mr Williams for the evidence he gathered and placed before the Commission.' In November 2021, Williams published Deep Collusion: Bain and the capture of South Africa based on his testimony and experience at Bain.

On 1 November 2021, Williams fled South Africa due to safety concerns. As a witness and whistle-blower who implicated dozens of individuals in the ongoing Zondo Commission, he feared possible reprisal. While in exile, Williams collaborated with Lord Peter Hain to draw global attention to Bain's corrupt activities in South Africa. One outcome of this campaign was the announcement by the UK government on 3 August 2022 that its investigation concluded Bain was 'guilty of grave professional misconduct' leading to a 3 year ban from state contracts.

Academic 
Williams was appointed as a Research Associate at Hertford College, Oxford University in 2022 in addition to his visiting tutor role at St. Catherine's College. 

He is the first person to earn five master's degrees from five global top-ranked universities. He is currently pursuing a DPhil in Politics (Political Theory) at the University of Oxford. He holds the following degrees:
 BSc (Engineering)(Mech), University of the Witwatersrand, 
 MBA, MIT Sloan School of Management 
 MSc (Finance), London Business School, 
 MPhil (Political Theory), University of Oxford (Hertford College)
 MPA, Harvard University 
 MSc (Political Theory), London School of Economics and Political Science.

Williams has held the positions of Adjunct Professor at University of the Witwatersrand and Senior Lecturer at the University of Cape Town, specialising in corporate responsibility and ethical leadership 
He was also a Research Fellow in the Centre for Applied Ethics at the University of Stellenbosch.

Writing 
From 2009 to 2014, Williams published his poetry under the pseudonym AE Ballakisten. His poetry typically addresses four themes: (i) social justice as in the poems When It Rains, Protest in Colombo and Coat of Arms (ii) exploration of our humanity as in Your Song (iii) inspiration as we find in 39 Postcards or (iv) the surreal as in the poem At Home.

Williams's academic writing focuses on corporate responsibility and business ethics. He is often published in the media on topics of poverty, youth literacy, social justice and corporate malfeasance.

Williams writes regularly on public affairs for publications in South Africa and is a regular radio guest and conference speaker. He has a regular column for Thought Leader and has recently published in the Mail & Guardian, The Big Issue and Business Day.

Bibliography

Poetry 
 Heap of Stones (2009; Theart Press)
 Talking to a Tree: Poems of a Fragile World (2011; Theart Press)
 
 Invitation (2017; Theart Press)
 Fragile (2020; Theart Press)
 Whistleblowing (2021; Geko Publishing)

Non-fiction 
 Deep Collusion: Bain and the capture of South Africa (2021; Tafelberg)
 Pushing Boulders: Oppressed to Inspired (2016; Theart Press)
 The Book of Eden: a spiritual philosophical revelation for a hopeful future (2019; Theart Press)

Children's books 
 The Oaky Series (illustrated by Taryn Lock; Theart Press): Oaky and the Sun (2014), Oaky the Happy Tree (2015), Oaky the Brave Acorn (2017), What is Happening to Oaky? (2017), Oaky Runs a Race (2018), Oaky and Themba (2019), Oaky and the Virus (2020), Oaky in the Playground (2021)
 A Girl Called H (2019, Theart Press)

Awards and honours 
 Sol Plaatje European Union Poetry Award (2015)
 Sol Plaatje European Union Poetry Award (2016)
 Parallel Universe Poetry Competition, Winner, Oxford University (2016).
 South African Independent Publishers Award (2017) for Invitation
 Cultural Affairs Award for Contribution to Literary Arts, Western Cape Provincial Government (2019).
 Special Recognition Award, Blueprint for Free Speech, Australia, 2022
 Chairman's Award, SA Chamber of Commerce UK, 2022

References

External links 
 
 Read to Rise

1970 births
Living people
21st-century South African philosophers
Cape Coloureds
Harvard Kennedy School alumni
MIT Sloan School of Management alumni
Social philosophers
South African children's writers
South African philanthropists
South African male poets
South African political philosophers
University of the Witwatersrand alumni
Writers from Cape Town
21st-century South African poets